Free-to-play (F2P or FtP) video games are games that give players access to a significant portion of their content without paying or do not require paying to continue playing. Free-to-play is distinct from traditional commercial software, which requires a payment before using the game or service. It is also separate from freeware games, which are entirely costless. Free-to-play's model is sometimes derisively referred to as free-to-start due to not being entirely free. Free to play games have also been widely criticized as “pay-to-win”— that is, that players can generally pay to obtain competitive or power advantages over other players.
 
There are several kinds of free-to-play business models. The most common is based on the freemium software model, in which users are granted access to a fully functional game but are incentivised to pay microtransactions to access additional content. Sometimes the content is entirely blocked without payment; other times it requires immense time 'unlocking' it for non-paying players, and paying the fee speeds the unlocking process. Another method of generating revenue is to integrate advertisements into the game.

The model was first popularly used in early massively multiplayer online games targeted towards casual gamers, before finding wider adoption among games released by major video game publishers to combat video game piracy.

Categories
There are several kinds of free-to-play games:
Shareware, a trial of variable functionality intended to convince users to buy a full license of the pay to play game. Also known as game demos, shareware often gives free users severely limited functionality compared to the full game.
Freemium games, such as Star Wars: The Old Republic, Apex Legends, Fortnite Battle Royale, and the majority of the MOBA games, offer the "full version" of a product free of charge, while users are charged micropayments to access premium features and virtual goods, often in a piecemeal fashion.

Game mechanics
In-game items can be purely cosmetic, enhance the power of the player, accelerate progression speed, and many more. A common technique used by developers of these games is for the items purchased to have a time limit; after this expires, the item must be repurchased before the user can continue. Another commonly seen mechanic is the use of two in-game currencies: one earned through normal gameplay, and another which can be purchased with real-world money. The second, "premium" currency is sometimes given out in small amounts to non-paying players at certain times, such as when they first start the game, complete a quest, or refer a friend to the game. Many browser games have an "energy bar" that depletes when the player takes actions. These games then sell items such as coffee or snacks to refill the bar.

Free-to-play games are free to install and play, but once the player enters the game, the player is able to purchase content such as items, maps, and expanded customization options. Some games, such as id Software's Quake Live, also use in-game advertising to provide income for free-to-play games. In addition to making in-game items available for purchase, EA integrates in-game advertising into its games. In August 2007, EA completed a deal with Massive Incorporated, which lets Massive update and change in-game advertising in real-time within EA games. Independent game developer Edmund McMillen has claimed that he makes most of his money from sponsors by placing advertisements into the introduction of a game and the game's title screen.

History
Matt Mihaly created the first known business model of exchanging virtual items for money in an online game, in 1997 for the flagship title Achaea, Dreams of Divine Lands for his corporation originally Achaea LLC that later became Iron Realms Entertainment. The free-to-play business model in online games was later realized by Nexon in South Korea to a degree first catching more major media attention at the time. The first Nexon game to use it, QuizQuiz, was released in October 1999. Its creator Lee Seungchan would go on to create MapleStory.

The free-to-play model originated in the late 1990s and early 2000s, coming from a series of highly successful MMOs targeted towards children and casual gamers, including Furcadia, Neopets, RuneScape, MapleStory, and text-based dungeons such as Achaea, Dreams of Divine Lands. Known for producing innovative titles, small independent developers also continue to release free-to-play games.

Free-to-play games are particularly prevalent in countries such as South Korea and the People's Republic of China. Microtransaction-based free-to-play mobile games and browser games such as Puzzle & Dragons, Kantai Collection and The Idolmaster Cinderella Girls also have large player populations in Japan. In particular, the Nikkei Shimbun reported that Cinderella Girls earns over 1 billion yen in revenue monthly from microtransactions. Electronic Arts first adopted the free-to-play concept in one of its games when it released FIFA Online in Korea.

In the late 2000s, many MMOs transitioned to the free-to-play model from subscriptions, including subscription-based games such as The Lord of the Rings Online: Shadows of Angmar, Age of Conan: Hyborian Adventures, Dungeons & Dragons Online, and Champions Online. This move from a subscription based model to a free-to-play one has proven very beneficial in some cases. Star Wars: The Old Republic is a good example of a game that transitioned from subscription to free-to-play. Turbine as of September 10, 2010 has given an F2P with Cash shop option to The Lord of the Rings Online which resulted in a tripling of profit. Sony Online Entertainment's move to transition EverQuest from a subscription model into a hybrid F2P/subscription game was followed by a 125% spike in item sales, a 150% up-tick in unique log-ins, and over three times as many account registrations.

The movement of free-to-play MMOs into the mainstream also coincided with experimentation with other genres as well. The model was picked up by larger developers and more diverse genres, with games such as Battlefield Heroes, Free Realms, Quake Live and Team Fortress 2 appearing in the late 2000s. The experimentation was not successful in every genre, however. Traditional real time strategy franchises such as Age of Empires and Command & Conquer both attempted free-to-play titles. Age of Empires Online was shut down in the midst of a tiny player base and stagnant revenue, and Command & Conquer: Generals 2 was shut down in alpha due to negative reactions from players.

In 2011, revenue from free-to-play games overtook revenue from premium games in the top 100 games in Apple's App Store. The percentage of people that spend money on in-game items in these games ranges from 0.5% to 6%, depending on a game's quality and mechanics. Even though this means that a large number of people will never spend money in a game, it also means that the people that do spend money could amount to a sizeable number due to the fact that the game was given away for free. Indeed a report from mobile advertising company firm SWRV stated that only 1.5 percent of players opted to pay for in-game items, and that 50 percent of the revenue for such games often came from just ten percent of players.  Nevertheless The Washington Post noted that the developers of two such games, Supercell (Clash of Clans) and Machine Zone (Game of War: Fire Age), were able to afford Super Bowl commercials in 2015 featuring big-name celebrities (respectively Liam Neeson and Kate Upton). The latter, Game of War, was in fact, part of a roughly $40 million campaign starring Upton.

As of 2012, free-to-play MOBAs, such as League of Legends, Dota 2, Heroes of the Storm, and Smite had become among the most popular PC games.  The success in the genre has helped convince many video game publishers to copy the free-to-play MOBA model.

During 2015, Slice Intelligence tracked people that bought products in mobile video games, and these players spent an average of $87 in free-to-play games. The highest spending per player in 2015 was in Game of War: Fire Age, where the players that bought products on average spent $550.

Comparison with traditional model
The free-to-play model has been described as a shift from the traditional model, also known as premium-priced games, where consumers paid for the cost of the game upfront and the game's success was measured by multiplying the number of units of a game sold by the unit price. Within free-to-play, the most important factor is the number of players that a game can keep continuously engaged, followed by how many compelling spending opportunities the game offers its players. With free games that include in-game purchases, two particularly important things occur: first, more people will try out the game since there is zero cost to doing so and second, revenue will likely be more than a traditional game since different players can now spend different amounts of money that depend on their engagement with the game and their preferences towards it. Player populations that spend money on free-to-play games can be broken up into terms that borrow from gambling: "whales" which typically are the smallest segment, up to around 10% of players, but are willing to spend the most on a game; "dolphins" which represent a larger portion of around 40% of players who spend some money but not as much as whales; and "minnows", representing about half the population, who spend the barest amount to maintain activity. As a result of this distribution, whales typically provide most of the revenue in free to play games, and in some cases, 50% of the revenue comes from 0.15% of players ("white whales") in one report. It is not unlikely for a very few players to spend tens of thousands of dollars in a game that they enjoy.

On the PC in particular, two problems are video game piracy and high system requirements. The free-to-play model attempts to solve both these problems by providing a game that requires relatively low system requirements and at no cost, and consequently provides a highly accessible experience funded by advertising and micropayments for extra content or an advantage over other players.

Free-to-play is newer than the pay to play model, and the video game industry is still attempting to determine the best ways to maximize revenue from their games. Gamers have cited the fact that purchasing a game for a fixed price is still inherently satisfying because the consumer knows exactly what they will be receiving, compared to free-to-play which requires that the player pay for most new content that they wish to obtain. The term itself, "free-to-play", has been described as one with a negative connotation. One video game developer noted this, stating, "Our hope—and the basket we're putting our eggs in—is that 'free' will soon be disassociated with [sic] 'shallow' and 'cruddy'." However, another noted that developing freeware games gave developers the largest amount of creative freedom, especially when compared to developing console games, which requires that the game follow the criteria as laid out by the game's publisher. Many kinds of revenue are being experimented with. For example, with its Free Realms game targeted to children and casual gamers, Sony makes money from the product with advertisements on loading screens, free virtual goods sponsored by companies such as Best Buy, a subscription option to unlock extra content, a collectible card game, a comic book, and micropayment items that include character customization options.

In 2020, a study from Germany concluded that some free-to-play games use the "money illusion" as a form to hide the true cost of products. When they examined the game Fortnite, they found that since the in-game currency does not have a unique exchange rate, it can conceal the true cost of an in-game purchase, resulting in players potentially paying more than they realize. In 2021 the study was used to take legal action against Epic Games, the publisher of Fortnite.

Pay-to-win
In some games, players who are willing to pay for special items, downloadable content, or to skip cooldown timers may be able to gain an advantage over those playing for free who might otherwise hardly be able to access said items. Such games are called "pay-to-win" (abbreviated as "P2W"). In general a game is considered pay-to-win when a player can gain any advantage over their non-paying peers. Market research indicates that pay-to-win mechanics are considered much more acceptable by players in China than in Western countries, possibly because Chinese players are more habituated to recurring costs associated with gaming, such as gaming café fees.

A common suggestion for avoiding pay-to-win is for payments to only be used to broaden the experience without affecting gameplay. For example, some games, such as Dota 2, Fortnite Battle Royale, and StarCraft II, only allow the purchase of cosmetic items, meaning that a player who has spent money on the game will still be on the same level as a player who has not. Others suggest finding a balance where a game encourages players to pay for extra content that enhances the game without making the free version feel limited by comparison. This theory is that players who do not pay for items would still increase awareness of it through word of mouth marketing, which ultimately benefits the game indirectly.

In response to concerns about players using payments to gain an advantage in the game, titles such as World of Tanks have explicitly committed to not giving paying players any advantages over their non-paying peers, while allowing the users buying the "gold" or "premium" ammo and expendables without paying the real money. However, features affecting gameplay and win rate, such as purchasing a 100% crew training level, a premium account, premium vehicles, and converting experience points to free experience points, remain available for the paying customers only.

Play-to-earn

Play-to-earn, also known as pay-to-earn, is a model of monetization that uses cryptocurrency and other blockchain technologies.

Nagging

In single-player games, another concern is the tendency for free games to constantly request that the player buy extra content, in a similar vein to nagware and trialware's frequent demands for the user to 'upgrade'. Payment may be required in order to survive or continue in the game, annoying or distracting the player from the experience. Some psychologists, such as Mark D. Griffiths, have criticized the mechanics of freemium games as exploitative, drawing direct parallels to gambling addiction.

Purchases by children
The ubiquitous and often intrusive use of microtransactions in free-to-play games has sometimes caused children to either inadvertently or deliberately pay for large amounts of virtual items, often for drastically high amounts of real money. In February 2013, Eurogamer reported that Apple had agreed to refund a British family £1700.41 after their son had purchased countless microtransactions whilst playing the F2P game Zombies vs. Ninjas.

Outlook
Pointing to the disruptive effect of free-to-play on current models, IGN editor Charles Onyett has said "expensive, one-time purchases are facing extinction". He believes that the current method of paying a one-time fee for most games will eventually disappear completely. Greg Zeschuk of BioWare believes there is a good possibility that free-to-play would become the dominant pricing plan for games, but that it was very unlikely that it would ever completely replace subscription-based games. Developers such as Electronic Arts have pointed to the success of freemium, saying that microtransactions will inevitably be part of every game. While noting the success of some developers with the model, companies such as Nintendo have remained skeptical of free-to-play, preferring to stick to more traditional models of game development and sales. In February 2015 Apple began featuring popular non-freemium software on the App Store as "Pay Once & Play", describing them as "Great Games with No In-App Purchases ... hours of uninterrupted fun with complete experiences".

See also
 List of commercial video games released as freeware
 List of PlayStation 4 free-to-play games
 Gacha
 Loot box

References

External links
 "Making money with 'free-to-play' games"  on CNET
 "What Are The Rewards Of 'Free-To-Play' MMOs?" on Gamasutra

Business models
Video game gameplay
Video game distribution
Revenue models